Coburg is a town located on the Itz river in the Upper Franconia region of Bavaria, Germany. Long part of one of the Thuringian states of the Wettin line, it joined Bavaria by popular vote only in 1920. Until the revolution of 1918, it was one of the capitals of the Duchy of Saxe-Coburg and Gotha and the Duchy of Saxe-Coburg-Saalfeld. 

Through successful dynastic policies, the ruling princely family married into several of the royal families of Europe, most notably in the person of Prince Albert, who married Queen Victoria in 1840. As a result of these close links with the royal houses of Europe in the late 19th and early 20th centuries, Coburg was frequently visited by the crowned heads of Europe and their families.

Coburg is the location of Veste Coburg, one of Germany's largest castles. In 1530, Martin Luther lived there for six months while translating the Bible into German (the Luther Bible).

Today, Coburg's population is close to 41,500. Since it was little damaged in World War II, Coburg retains many historic buildings, making it a popular tourist destination.

Geography

Location
It is an urban district and is surrounded by the Landkreis Coburg. Coburg lies at the foot of the Thuringian Highland. Coburg, Bavaria was part of West Germany until reunification in 1990, but on three sides it borders Thuringia which was East Germany. The border between Bavaria and Thuringia was also the inner German border.

Subdivisions

Coburg is divided into 15 Stadtteile:
 Coburg (town proper)
Beiersdorf
Bertelsdorf
Cortendorf
Creidlitz
Glend
Ketschendorf
Löbelstein
Lützelbuch
Neu- and Neershof
 
Rögen
Scheuerfeld
Seidmansdorf
Wüstenahorn

History

11th century to 16th century

Coburg was first mentioned in a monastic document dated 1056, which marked the transfer of ownership to the Archbishop-Elector of Cologne, although there was a settlement at the site that predates it called Trufalistat. The origin of the name Coburg is unclear; the first element may be kuh, which would give a literal meaning of "cow borough".

"Coburg" initially referred to a property centred on the hill where Veste Coburg was later built. Its oldest remains date to the 12th or 13th century. In 1248, the castle came into possession of the House of Henneberg and in 1353 it passed to the House of Wettin with the marriage of Frederick III with Catherine of Henneberg and was initially regarded by them as a Saxon outpost within Franconia.

During the Diet of Augsburg in 1530 reformer Martin Luther spent six months at the castle (located at the southernmost point of the Saxon duchy) while his liege lord, John, Elector of Saxony, attended the Diet. Luther was forbidden to attend by the Elector, who feared that he would be imprisoned and burned as a heretic. While quartered at the castle Luther continued with his translation of the Bible into German.

In 1547, the princely residence was moved from the Veste to a former monastery, rebuilt as a Renaissance palace, the Ehrenburg.

17th century to early 20th century
In 1596, Coburg was raised to the status of capital of one of the dynasty's splintered Saxon-Thuringian territories, the newly created Duchy of Saxe-Coburg under the leadership of Duke John Casimir (ruled 1596–1633). From 1699 to 1826, it was one of the two capitals of the Duchy of Saxe-Coburg-Saalfeld, and from 1826 to 1918 it was a capital of the Duchy of Saxe-Coburg-Gotha.
 
Ernest Frederick, the fourth Duke of Saxe-Coburg-Saalfeld, moved his capital from Saalfeld to Coburg in 1764. Coburg then became capital of the Duchy of Saxe-Coburg-Saalfeld and later of the Duchy of Saxe-Coburg and Gotha.

In the early 19th century, the town's medieval fortifications were demolished and replaced by parks. The duke also started the collection of copperplate engravings that is today part of the Veste Coburg museum. He also rebuilt the Ehrenburg in Gothic revival style.

During the 19th century, dynastic marriages created ties with the royal families of Belgium, Bulgaria, Portugal and Britain. This turned the ducal family from the rulers of a fairly obscure backwater duchy into one playing an influential role in European politics. The era of political influence peaked with Leopold Frederick; born Prince of Saxe-Coburg-Saalfeld, becoming the King of Belgium in 1831 and Prince Albert of Saxe-Coburg and Gotha, born in Schloss Rosenau, marrying his first cousin, Queen Victoria in 1840. 

The marriage between Albert and Victoria established the present British royal house, which renamed itself Windsor during World War I. This marriage led to a union with Germany's ruling dynasty, the Hohenzollerns, when the couple's eldest child, Victoria, married the future Kaiser Friedrich III.

After her marriage, Queen Victoria said of Coburg: 

Due to the royal connections among the royal houses of Europe, Coburg was the site of many royal Ducal weddings and visits. Britain's Queen Victoria made six visits to Coburg during her 63-year reign. In 1894 the wedding of Ernest Louis, Grand Duke of Hesse and Princess Victoria Melita of Saxe-Coburg and Gotha brought together Queen Victoria, her son Edward (future Edward VII), her second son Alfred (Duke of Saxe-Coburg-Gotha), her daughter the German Dowager Empress Friedrich (Victoria), and many of her grandchildren, such as future Tsar Nicholas and Alexandra of Russia (Alix of Hesse), Kaiser Wilhelm II of Germany, and the future King George V of the United Kingdom.

In November 1918, the last Duke of Saxe-Coburg and Gotha, Charles Edward, abdicated. The Freistaat Coburg which now came into being had to decide whether to become part of Thuringia or Bavaria. In a November 1919 referendum, the locals voted to join Bavaria with an 88% majority. On 1 July 1920, Coburg joined Bavaria.

Nazi era
In 1929, Coburg was the first German town in which the Nazi Party won the absolute majority of the popular vote during municipal elections. In 1932, Coburg was the first German town to make Adolf Hitler an honorary citizen.

Jewish community of Coburg
Coburg had Jewish citizens as early as the 14th century. In the 1870s they were granted permission to permanently lease the Church of St. Nicholas for conversion into a synagogue. In 1931 an unofficial boycott was imposed against Jewish businesses. In 1932 the municipal council abrogated the lease of St. Nicholas Church. In 1933 the synagogue was closed down. It still remains standing. On 25 March 1933, 40 Jews in Coburg were arrested and tortured. They were not released until the affair became internationally known.

On 9 November 1938, Kristallnacht, all Jewish men were interned. Jewish homes, shops, and the school were destroyed. Coburg's Jewish community numbered 68 in 1869, 210 (1.3% of the total population) in 1880, 316 (1.3%) in 1925, and 233 (0.9%) in 1933. Around 150 managed to leave by 1942, either emigrating from Germany or moving to other German cities. The rest were deported to Riga, Izbica, and Theresienstadt in three transports between November 1941 and September 1942. The memorial book of the German Federal Archives for the victims of the Nazi persecution of Jews in Germany lists in particular 63 Jewish inhabitants of Coburg, who were deported and mostly murdered. Coburg's Jewish community was not reestablished after the war.

Post World War II
After World War II, which Coburg survived largely undamaged, the town faced the challenge of integrating over 15,000 refugees. While the other Saxon-Thuringian principalities were incorporated into the German Democratic Republic, Bavarian Coburg became part of West Germany. As a result, the town spent the Cold War years lying right next to the Iron Curtain, surrounded by East German territory on three sides and cut off from much of its natural back country.

In 1946, Polish ambassador Oskar R. Lange alleged that Coburg was a base for the Western Allies to organize a Polish armed insurgency led by Władysław Anders against the Soviet-backed communists in Poland.

Demographics
Over two-thirds of Coburg's population live in the core town of Coburg rather than in one of the Stadtteile merged with it in the 20th century. Some of those retain a largely rural character.

Religion
Most residents of Coburg are members of the Evangelical Church (Lutheran). Other Christian communities are Baptists, Seventh-day Adventists, the ICF Movement, Jehovah's Witnesses, Catholics, Old Catholics and the New Apostolic Church, as well as the Church of Jesus Christ of Latter-day Saints. There are also three communities of Muslims. Coburg had a large Jewish community until the 1940s. Jews had lived there since the 14th century. The old synagogue was a former church. Today it is used by Old Catholics. Coburg became Protestant after the Reformation. All Catholics were persecuted. A new Catholic community was founded in the 19th century.

Economy
In 1919 Max Brose and Ernst Jüngling established the metal works Max Brose & Co. to manufacture car parts. The company is still in operation today, as Brose Fahrzeugteile.

In 1950, the Haftpflicht-Unterstützungs-Kasse kraftfahrender Beamter Deutschlands a. G. (today ) relocated from Erfurt to Coburg.

Kapp Werkzeugmaschinen has been a manufacturer of gear-milling machines since 1953, after taking over the production assets of COMAG (Coburger Maschinenbau GmbH).

Waldrich-Coburg, founded in 1920, manufactures CNC-milling machines in a range of sizes, the largest of which can handle an object of size 50 x 14 x 10 metres.

Founded in 1919, Kaeser Compressors produces air compressors in various sizes.
 
Coburg has an above-average share of goods-producing employees. In 2013, out of 32,962 employees 10,421 worked in the manufacturing or construction sectors (31% vs. a national average of 24%), 4,853 in trade, transport and tourism, 10,381 in professional services and 7,230 in public and private services.

Hotels in Coburg counted over 61,000 overnight visitors in 2014 (of which around 53,000 were from Germany). They stayed for a total of almost 120,000 nights, or close to two nights per stay on average.

In 2017, the GDP per inhabitant was €91,506 in Coburg, placing it 5th among the 96 urban and rural districts (Bavarian average: €46,698).

Twin towns – sister cities

Coburg is twinned with:

 Cobourg, Canada
 Gais, Italy
 Isle of Wight, England, United Kingdom
 Niort, France
 Oudenaarde, Belgium
 Toledo, United States

Coat of arms

Coburg's coat of arms, honouring the town's German patron Saint Maurice, was granted in 1493. In 1934, the Nazi government forbade any glorification of the African race, and they replaced the coat of arms with one depicting a vertical sword with a Nazi swastika on the pommel. The original coat of arms was restored in 1945 at the end of World War II. Today, the silhouette of the patron saint of the city of Coburg can be found mainly on manhole covers and the city coat of arms.

Attractions
Coburg has the typical features of a former capital of a German princely state. There are numerous houses from the 16th, 17th and 18th centuries. The most important landmarks include:

 Ehrenburg, a former Franciscan convent built in 1220 and turned into a palace in 1543–1549. It was repeatedly renovated until the 19th century. Ehrenburg was gutted by fire in 1690 and rebuilt in a Baroque style, with stucco work by North Italian craftsmen that includes a "Hall of the Giants" (which contains a plaque that states it was the location of the first meeting between Britain's Queen Victoria and Franz Josef Emperor of Austria in 1860). The internal decoration dates from the late 17th to early 18th centuries. Its Gothic Revival exterior was remodelled by Karl Friedrich Schinkel in the 19th century. It now also houses a museum as well as a library.
 Stadtkirche St. Moriz ("St. Maurice", 14th–16th centuries), is a Gothic edifice on the Hallenkirche plan with two towers. The interior, remade in the 18th century, include the notable funerary moment of Duke Johann Casimir for his parents, a 13 m-tall alabaster sculpture painted with statue and reliefs (1595–1598).
 The medieval Veste Coburg, one of the biggest castles in Germany, built starting in 1225 (upon the site of an 11th-century chapel). It was mostly rebuilt in the 19th century. It has a triple line of walls with numerous towers. Today the Veste Coburg is home to three museums. One is the Fürstenbau (ducal palace), with many furnished rooms of the Dukes of Coburg, including the apartment where Martin Luther lived in 1530. Probably the most notable room in the castle (unique in all of Germany) is the Jagdzimmer (hunting room) of 1632, which is entirely made of marquetry wood inlay, done up with over 60 marquetry panels, deeply coffered marquetry ceilings and a wood paneled floor. Another museum is the Rüstkammer (armory), containing the largest collection of medieval armour and weaponry in Germany, with over 10,500 items. The third is the Kunstsammlungen, which contains a collection of 300,000 copperplate engravings (Kupferstich-Kabinett), a 20,000 piece coin collection (Münzkabinett), a 7,000 piece documentation collection (Briefe & Urkunden), and a 3,500 piece glassware collection (Gläser-Sammlung).
 Gymnasium Casimirianum, a Renaissance building begun in 1601
 Arsenal (1616–21).
 Landestheater Coburg, a Neoclassical theatre on Schlossplatz, whose other landmarks include the Ehrenburg, the Palais Edinburgh (1865), the Arkaden (1840), Reithalle (1852) and Marstall (rebuilt in 1920). 
 The Coburg Doll Museum is located near the Schlossplatz and the city centre. It was once the residence of the poet Friedrich Rückert. It houses over 1,000 dolls, including the grandmother of the world-famous "Barbie".
 .
The seat of the public administration of Coburg was moved here in 1438. The original Gothic building proved to be too small and after 1570 the town bought additional properties and erected a Renaissance building at the corner with Ketschengasse. In another rebuilding in 1750-2 both structures were merged. The appearance of the town hall changed, only the round bay on the corner remained. The old roofs were replaced by the current garret roof and the colourful paintings were added to the façade in the 18th century. Another renovation took place in 1903, when the balcony to the market square was added and stairwell and entrance were redesigned.
 , a late Renaissance building from 1597 to 1599 built under Duke Johann Casimir to house the ducal administration. It occupies the complete northern side of the market square.
 Rose Garden, park.
 Callenberg Castle, with Saxe-Coburg family art collection and National Shooting Museum.
 Schloss Rosenau near Coburg.
 St. Augustin, Catholic parish church opened in 1860.
 The Baroque Basilica of the Vierzehnheiligen,  outside the town.
 The Coburg Bay Windows, a variant of the corner bay window, so only in Coburg was built. It dates from the end of the 16th century and is characterized by three architectural features. These are a supporting pillar in front of the corner of the house, a two-story construction and the closure with a Welsche hood.

Arts and culture
Coburg is home to two major festivals:  and Johann Strauss Musiktage. Coburg is referred to as "Europe's Capital of Samba."

As a result of the large presence of the US Army prior to German re-unification, Americans and American culture are still present in Coburg and the surrounding area. This influence ranges from American-style pubs and restaurants to two sports clubs sponsoring baseball teams.

Trivia
The National Hot Dog and Sausage Council asserts that Frankfurt is traditionally credited with originating the frankfurter. According to the council, this claim is disputed and the hot dog was created in the late 17th century by Johann Georghehner, a butcher, living in Coburg.

A popular local delicacy is the Coburger bratwurst, a sausage (the official measure of which is denoted by the marshall's staff held by the statue of the town's patron, Sankt Mauritius, located on the town hall and overlooking the square) roasted over a pine cone fire. The sausage is served in a semmel (a small bread bun, a third the size of the sausage itself), and is highly popular with locals and tourists alike. According to rumours, the Coburger bratwurst was first produced in 1530 on the occasion of a stay and boarding of Martin Luther and the Electoral Train.

Coburg Peak on Trinity Peninsula in Graham Land, Antarctica, is named after the town, in connection with the Bulgarian royal house of Coburg (Saxe-Coburg-Gotha).

Infrastructure

Transport

Car
Coburg can be reached by car via B 303 Schweinfurt-Coburg-Schirnding, B 4 Hamburg-Coburg-Nuremberg or motorway A 73 Suhl-Coburg-Nuremberg.

Railways

Coburg has four train stations:
Coburg-Neuses
Coburg-Nord
Coburg main station
Coburg-Creidlitz

From the main station one can go to Lichtenfels, Bamberg, Forchheim, Erlangen, Fürth and Nuremberg, to Neustadt bei Coburg, Sonneberg, to Bad Rodach and to Kulmbach, Neuenmarkt-Wirsberg.
Since December 2017, the Coburg station is served by Intercity Express high speed trains of the Munich-Nuremberg-Coburg-Erfurt-Berlin(-Hamburg) line (Nuremberg–Erfurt high-speed railway).

Airports
Small planes can land on the two airfields:
 Coburg Brandensteinsebene (ICAO-Code: EDQC, founded in 1912)
 Coburg Steinrücken (ICAO-Code: EDQY)

Large airports nearby are in Frankfurt, Erfurt and Nuremberg.

Local public transport system 
The public transport system in Coburg is operated by SÜC (Stadt- und Überlandwerke Coburg) with 9 bus lines. The OVF (Omnibus Verkehr Franken) covers Coburg's surrounding countryside with an additional 11 bus lines.

Notable people

Born in Coburg

Before 1900
 Princess Charlotte Wilhelmine of Saxe-Coburg-Saalfeld (1685–1767), Princess and Countess of Hanau-Münzenberg
 Princess Luise Dorothea of Saxe-Meiningen (1710–1767), Duchess of Saxony-Gotha and Altenburg
 Anton Schweitzer (1735–1787), composer
 Prince Josias of Saxe-Coburg-Saalfeld (1737–1815), Austrian field marshal
 Johann Christian August Clarus (1774–1854), physician
 Leopold I of Belgium (1790–1865), born to Francis, Duke of Saxe-Coburg-Saalfeld, first king of the Belgians
 Gustav König (1808–1869), painter
 Prince Albert (1819–1861), husband of Queen Victoria, was born in Schloss Rosenau.
 William Frishmuth (1830–1893), architect and metallurgist
 Ernst Marlier (1875–1948), German pharmaceutical manufacturer who built the Wannsee Villa, venue of the Wannsee Conference.
 Alexander von Mensdorff-Pouilly (1813–1871), Austrian statesman
 Fritz Mollwitz (1890–1967), professional baseball player, was born here.
 Ernest II, Duke of Saxe-Coburg and Gotha (1818–1893)
 Heinrich Rückert (1823–1875), historian and Germanist
 Felix Draeseke (1835–1913), composer
 Max Brückner (1836–1919), theater painter
 Princess Amalie of Saxe-Coburg and Gotha (1848–1894), Princess and Duchess in Bavaria
 Bernhard Fischer (1852–1915), hygienist
 Eduard Study (1862–1930), mathematician
 Anna Ritter (née Nuhn, 1865–1921), poet and writer
 Otto Appel (1867–1952), phytomedicine doctor
 Anna Bernhardine Eckstein (1868–1947), champion of world peace
 Hans Berger (1873–1941), neurologist and psychiatrist
 Princess Alexandra of Saxe-Coburg and Gotha (1878–1942), Princess of Great Britain and Ireland and a member of the House of Saxony-Coburg and the Gotha family and later by marriage Princess to Hohenlohe-Langenburg
 Louis Oppenheim (1879–1936), utility graphic artist
 Fred Immler (1880–1965), actor
 Charles Edward, Duke of Saxe-Coburg and Gotha (1884–1954), the last Duke of Saxony-Coburg and Gotha

After 1900

 Hans Morgenthau (1904–1980), jurist and political scientist
 Kurt Eccarius (1905-died after 1969), head of the detention area in Sachsenhausen concentration camp
 Ernst Kupfer (1907–1944), fighter pilot in the Second World War 
 Yvonne Desportes (1907–1993), French composer
 Princess Sibylla of Saxe-Coburg and Gotha (1908–1972), Princess of Sweden, married to hereditary prince Gustav Adolf of Sweden and mother of King Carl XVI Gustav of Sweden
 Günther Weißenborn (1911–2001), pianist, composer and conductor
 Eva Ahnert-Rohlfs (1912–1954), astronomer
 Wolfgang Stammberger (1920–1982), politician (FDP, SPD), Member of Bundestag, Federal Minister of Justice, Lord Mayor of Coburg
 Heinrich Strecker (1922–2013), composer of operettas and Viennese music 
 Werner Scheler (born 1923), physician and pharmacologist
 Tatunca Nara (born 1941), German-Brazilian impostor
 Klaus Volk (born 1944), lawyer and criminal lawyer
 Klaus-Peter Göpfert (born 1948), wrestler
 Michael Stoschek (born 1948/1949), businessman and entrepreneur
 Klaus Janson (born 1952), American comic artist
 Martin May (born 1961), actor, author and narrator
 Bernd Friedmann (born 1965), musician and producer
 Frank Greiner (born 1966), footballer
 Claudia Porwik (born 1968), tennis player
 Andreas Hackethal (born 1971), professor
 Julia Stoschek (born 1975), art collector
Cevat Yerli (born 1978), computer game developer 
 Martin Forkel (born 1979), footballer
 Andreas Wolf (born 1990), handball player
 Marius Wolf (born 1995), footballer

Lived at Coburg
Baroness Louise Lehzen (1784–1870), governess and confidante of Queen Victoria
Walter von Boetticher (1853–1945), historian, genealogist and physician
Hans Berger (1873–1941), psychiatrist
Johann Strauss, he lived the last 13 years of his life in Coburg, and buried in Vienna
Adolf Hitler in 1922 led several hundred stormtroopers in a march through the city, fighting pitched street battles with communists. During the Nazi era, the Coburg Badge (made to honor the participants) was one of the most prestigious party medals.

References

Further reading

External links

 Coburg Tourist Board
 World sites atlas 
 Schloss- und Gartenverwaltung Coburg
 Twin towns of Coburg

 
Saxe-Coburg and Gotha